Saint David may refer to:

People
Saint David (Dewi Sant, c. 500–587), patron saint of Wales
Saint David's Day, 1 March
King David of Israel, feast day December 29
King David I of Scotland (1084–1153)
Saint David of Muscovy (aka Saint Gleb – see Boris and Gleb)
Saint David the Dendrite (tree-dweller), or David of Thessalonica
Saint David Roldán Lara (1902–1926), Mexican martyr
Saint David Lewis (Jesuit) (1616–1679), Welsh Catholic martyr
Saints of the Cristero War, two of whom were named David
David of Munktorp, 11th-century missionary to Sweden
David of Augsburg
David Livingstone
David IV of Georgia
David Galván Bermúdez
David the Scot
David Zeisberger
David Nemanjić
David Gareji
David the Invincible

Places
St Davids, Pembrokeshire, Wales, smallest city in the United Kingdom
Saint David Parish, Dominica
Saint David Parish, Grenada
Saint David Parish, Saint Vincent and the Grenadines
Saint David Parish, New Brunswick, Canada, a civil parish near St. Stephen
Saint David, Trinidad and Tobago
St. David, Arizona, United States
St. David, Illinois, United States
St. Davids, Pennsylvania, United States
St. David (provincial electoral district), defunct electoral district (1926–1987) in Ontario, Canada

Establishments
St David's Cathedral in St David's, Pembrokeshire, Wales
St David's Cathedral (Hobart), Tasmania, Australia
St. David Catholic Secondary School, high school in Waterloo, Ontario
St. David's School (Raleigh, North Carolina), US
St. Davids (SEPTA station), a commuter rail station in Pennsylvania, US

Human name disambiguation pages